The Secret Seven is a 1940 American crime film directed by James Moore and starring Florence Rice, Barton MacLane and Bruce Bennett.

Synopsis
After being released from prison where he has been serving time after a youthful mistake, Pat Norris sets out to bring down organized crime in the city headed by racketeer Sam O'Donnell. He receives assistance from Lola, the Chief of Police's daughter.

Cast

 Florence Rice as Lola Hobbs
 Barton MacLane as 	Sam O'Donnell
 Bruce Bennett as 	Pat Norris
 Joseph Crehan as 	Police Chief Hobbs
 Joe Downing as Lou Bodie 
 Howard Hickman as Dr. Talbot 
 Edward Van Sloan as 	Prof. Holtz
 Don Beddoe as 	Maj. Blinn
 P.J. Kelly as 	Prof. Cordet
 William Forrest as Brooks
 George Anderson as 	Bennett
 Danton Ferrero as 	De Soto
 Cy Schindell as 	Felton 
 Duke York as 	Karpa 
 John Tyrrell as 	Candy 
 	Jessie Perry as 	Mrs. Norris 
 Eddie Laughton as 	Bishop 
 John Dilson as 	Walter Carter 
 George Magrill as Scarlotti 
 Sam Ash as 	Adams 
 George McKay as Golden
 Ivan Miller as 	Prison Warden 
 Herb Vigran as 	Salesman 
 Hugh Beaumont as Southern Racketeer 
 Edmund Cobb as 	Policeman 
 Eddie Acuff as Driver 
 Edward Earle as Twine Company Manager
 Lester Dorr as Racketeer 
 Raymond Bailey as Racketeer
 Evelyn Young as 	Holtz Maid

References

Bibliography
 Dick, Bernard F. Columbia Pictures: Portrait of a Studio. University Press of Kentucky, 2015.

External links
 

1940 films
1940 crime films
American crime films
American black-and-white films
Columbia Pictures films
1940s English-language films
1940s American films